The Free Republic of Schwarzenberg is a term applied to portions of western Saxony that were briefly not occupied by the Allies after the surrender of Nazi Germany on May 8, 1945. These districts of Saxony were thus self-governing for several weeks before occupation under the Soviet Union. 

After the surrender of Nazi Germany, the Saxony districts of Schwarzenberg, Stollberg, and Aue in the Ore Mountains were left unoccupied by Allies for unknown reasons. This led to anti-fascist groups forming local governments in those towns and villages, ending with the area's occupation by Soviet troops on June 24, 1945.

There has been speculation as to why neither American nor Soviet troops immediately occupied the area. One explanation is that the Soviets and Americans agreed to halt on the banks of the Mulde river. Because there are several rivers with this name, and the Schwarzenberg area lies between them, there may have been some misunderstanding over the agreed boundaries. Another possible explanation is that the Allies simply overlooked the area until the lack of occupation was noticed.

Government and organisation
The authority of the newly generated anti-fascist councils was still subject to democratic structures, though they were never intended to build a nation-state. The councils dealt with humanitarian issues since the unoccupied county of Schwarzenberg was not supported by any military force at the time. Issues the council dealt with included the maintenance of law and order, as well as dealing with scattered German soldiers fleeing west to avoid Soviet imprisonment.

After the Soviet occupation in June 1945, the councils were dismissed. However, their work was appreciated by the Soviets, and some councilmen kept their positions in similar Soviet-initiated councils for several years even after the German Democratic Republic was founded in 1949.

Popular culture

The name "Free Republic of Schwarzenberg" is derived from the 1984 novel Schwarzenberg by Stefan Heym. As the novel is based on actual events, the name has become a convenient descriptor, although the book is primarily a work of fiction rather than a historical record.

The Haus Schwarzenberg structure in Berlin is named after the Free Republic of Schwarzenberg. The place contains street art, galleries, shops, and a center named after diarist and Holocaust victim Anne Frank.

References

 Stefan Heym, Schwarzenberg (Munich: Bertelsmann, 1984), 

States and territories disestablished in 1945
20th century in Saxony
Aftermath of World War II in Germany
Allied occupation of Germany
States and territories established in 1945
History of the Ore Mountains